Guilherme Xavier de Sousa was a Brazilian Marshal and politician who participated in the Paraguayan War as well as other conflicts. He was also the 42nd governor of Rio Grande do Sul from July 14, 1868 to August 1 of the same year.

Biography
Guilherme Xavier was the son of Captain Antônio Xavier de Sousa.  

His military career began on November 20, 1834, when he was seated as a soldier, and as a 2nd class Cadet on December 17, 1834. He fought against the Farroupilhas, during the Ragamuffin War, and against the Paulistas of the Liberal rebellions of 1842. On June 8, 1865 Guilherme Xavier de Souza joined the Imperial Brazilian Army at the camp located in Vila de Concórdia in the Argentine Province of Entre Ríos. In 1867 he was promoted to field marshal  the province of Rio Grande do Sul, and in 1868 the Minister of War, the Baron of Muritiba, ordered him to embark for Paraguay to replace the Marquis of Caxias in the Command of the Brazilian forces. On January 18, 1869, he took command of Brazilian soldiers until he passed the command to the Count of Eu on April 19, 1869.

He was a deputy to the Provincial Legislative Assembly of Santa Catarina in the 15th legislature (1864 — 1865), as a summoned alternate and in the 17th legislature (1868 — 1869). He was governor of Rio Grande do Sul from July 14 to August 1, 1868.

He was married to Clara Angélica Xavier Fagundes, and they had no children. He was lord of João da Cruz e Sousa, who was freed when he was only four years old and treated João as the couple's foster son and soon became the precursor poet of Symbolism in Brazil. Guilherme was also an abolitionist at a time when the struggle to end slavery hadn't yet been abolished in Brazil.

Guilherme Xavier returned from Paraguay on May 18, 1869, already ill, and died on December 21, 1870 in the city of Desterro at the age of 52.

In his honor, the 10th Mountain Light Infantry Battalion, in Juiz de Fora, Minas Gerais was named as Battalion Marechal Guilherme Xavier de Sousa. There is a street in Florianópolis bearing his name known as Rua Marechal Guilherme.

References

1817 births
1870 deaths
Marshals of Brazil
Brazilian military personnel of the Paraguayan War
People from Florianópolis
Governors of Rio Grande do Sul
19th-century Brazilian politicians
Brazilian abolitionists